Sticks 'N' Stones EP is an extended play (EP) by English singer-songwriter Jamie T, released on 29 June 2009 as the lead single from his second album, Kings & Queens. The EP was his first release since 2007's Panic Prevention album. The song "St. Christopher" was given an exclusive preview on Lauren Laverne's BBC 6 Music show on Saturday 20 June and "On the Green" was posted on Jamie T's Myspace around the same time. The title track is about Jamie travelling on the train and his reminiscing about things that he'd seen on the line.

The EP peaked at number 15 in the United Kingdom and was later certified platinum by the British Phonographic Industry for sales and streams exceeding 600,000.

Track listing
UK CD and digital download EP
 "Sticks 'n' Stones" – 4:04
 "St Christopher" – 3:57
 "On the Green" – 3:36
 "The Dance of the Young Professionals" – 3:12

Charts

Weekly charts

Year-end charts

Certifications

References

2009 EPs
Jamie T albums
Virgin Records EPs